Daud Shah, born Daud Khan, was a ruler of the Muzaffarid dynasty, who reigned over the Gujarat Sultanate from few days in 1458.

On the death of Gujarat Sultan Qutb-ud-dín Ahmad Shah II, the nobles raised to the throne his uncle Daud, son of Ahmad Shah I. But as Daud appointed a carpet-spreader to high offices and committed improper acts, he was deposed after reign of seven or, according to some source twenty seven days. In 1459 his half-brother Fateh Khán, the son of Muhammad Shah II by Bibi Mughli, a daughter of Jám Júna of Samma dynasty ruling from Thatta in Sindh; was seated on the throne at the age of little more than thirteen with the title of Mahmúd Sháh I, later popularly named Mahmud Begada.

References

Gujarat sultans
15th-century Indian monarchs